Alyaksandr Pawlavich Valadzko, also spelled sometimes as Aleksandr Pavlovich Volodko (born 18 June 1986) is a Belarusian former footballer of Polish descent.

Career
He spent 10 years playing for BATE Borisov as a central defender or defensive midfielder. He was part of the Belarus U-21 squad that participated in the 2009 UEFA European Under-21 Football Championship. On 19 September 2012, Valadzko opened the scoring and assisted the third goal in BATE's 3–1 away victory over LOSC Lille, which was the first Champions League group stage win in the team's history. Following his strong performances for BATE, he was called up to the senior national team for the first time in October 2012 for two 2014 World Cup qualifiers against Spain and Georgia. He made his debut on 12 October 2012, playing the first half of the 0–4 loss against the Iberians.

International goals
Scores and results list Belarus' goal tally first.

Honours
Dinamo Brest
Belarusian Cup winner: 2006–07

BATE Borisov
Belarusian Premier League champion: 2008, 2009, 2010, 2011, 2012, 2013, 2014, 2015, 2016, 2017
Belarusian Cup winner: 2009–10, 2014–15
Belarusian Super Cup winner: 2010, 2011, 2014, 2016, 2017

Shakhtyor Soligorsk
Belarusian Cup winner: 2018–19

References

External links
 
 Player profile at official BATE website
 

1986 births
Living people
People from Motal
Belarusian people of Polish descent
Belarusian footballers
Association football midfielders
Belarus international footballers
Belarusian expatriate footballers
Belarusian expatriate sportspeople in Kazakhstan
Expatriate footballers in Kazakhstan
FC Dynamo Brest players
FC BATE Borisov players
FC Shakhter Karagandy players
FC Shakhtyor Soligorsk players
Sportspeople from Brest Region